The 2006 IIFA Awards, officially known as the 7th International Indian Film Academy Awards  ceremony, presented by the International Indian Film Academy honoured the best films of 2005 and took place between 15 and 17 June 2006. Dubai, with its old world charm and new age dynamism played host to the 3 day IIFA Weekend and its many events.

The official ceremony took place on 17 June 2006, at the Dubai International Convention Centre, in Dubai, UAE. During the ceremony, IIFA Awards were awarded in 29 competitive categories. The ceremony was televised in India and internationally on Star Plus. Actors Fardeen Khan and Lara Dutta co-hosted the ceremony. Fardeen had also co-hosted the 2005 IIFA awards while Lara had hosted the 2002 awards

The weekend began with the IIFA Inaugural Press Conference. This was followed by the IIFA World Premiere of Jagmohan Mundra's 'Provoked'. The world premiere also featured south Indian films viz., Chandramukhi, Kannathil Muthamittal, Nayakan, Pokiri, Autograph, Anniyan and Ayutha Ezhuthu. A unique IIFA Foundation Fashion Extravaganza was also hosted to raise funds for the IIFA Foundation.

Parineeta led the ceremony with 17 nominations, followed by Black with 11 nominations and Bunty Aur Babli with 7 nominations.

Black won 9 awards, including Best Film, Best Director (for Sanjay Leela Bhansali), Best Actor (for Amitabh Bachchan), Best Actress (for Rani Mukherji) and Best Supporting Actress (for Ayesha Kapur), thus becoming the most-awarded film at the ceremony.

Other multiple awards winners included Parineeta with 6 awards, Bunty Aur Babli with 4 awards and Aashiq Banaya Aapne, Apaharan and Dus receiving 2 awards each. In addition movies receiving a single award included, Sarkar for (Best Supporting Actor), Salaam Namaste for (Best Comedian), Hazaaron Khwaishein Aisi for (Best Male Debut) and Iqbal for (Best Story).

Saif Ali Khan received dual nominations for Best Actor for his performances in Parineeta and Salaam Namaste, but lost to Amitabh Bachchan, who himself received dual nominations in the category for his performances in Black and Sarkar, winning for the former.

Rani Mukherji received dual nominations for Best Actress for her performances in Black and Bunty Aur Babli, winning for the former,

Background
The awards began in 2000 and the first ceremony was held in London at The Millennium Dome. From then on, the awards were held at locations around the world signifying the international success of Bollywood. The next award ceremony was announced to be held in Sheffield, England in 2007.

Winners and nominees
Winners are listed first and highlighted in boldface.

Popular awards

Musical awards

Backstage awards

Technical awards

Special awards

Most Glamorous Star of the Year
 Preity Zinta

Outstanding Achievement In Indian Cinema
 Asha Parekh

Multiple nominations and awards

The following eleven films received multiple nominations:
 Seventeen: Parineeta
 Eleven: Black
 Seven: Bunty Aur Babli
 Six: Dus
 Four: Page 3 and Aashiq Banaya Aapne
 Five: Iqbal
 Three: Apaharan, Salaam Namaste and Bluffmaster!
 Two: No Entry, Paheli, Kalyug, Hazaaron Khwaishein Aisi and Garam Masala

The following films received multiple awards:
 Nine: Black
 Six: Parineeta
 Four: Bunty Aur Babli
 Three:Krrish
 Two: Dus, Apaharan and Aashiq Banaya Aapne

References

Iifa Awards
IIFA awards